Insa-dong is a dong, or neighborhood in the Jongno-gu district of Seoul. The main street is Insadong-gil, which is connected to a multitude of alleys that lead deeper into the district, with modern galleries and tea shops. Historically, it was the largest market for antiques and artwork in Korea.

Stretching across 12.7 hectares (or 31.4 acres), the district is bordered by Gwanhun-dong to the north, Nagwon-dong to the east, and Jongno 2-ga and Jeokseon-dong to the south, and Gongpyeong-dong to the west.

History 
Insadong originally comprised two towns whose names ended in the syllables "In" and "Sa". They were divided by a stream which ran along Insadong's current main street. Insadong began 500 years ago as an area of residence for government officials. During the early period of the Joseon Dynasty (1392–1897), the place belonged to Gwanin-bang and Gyeonpyeong-bang - bang was the name of an administrative unit during the time - of Hanseong (old name for the capital, Seoul). During the Japanese occupation, wealthy Korean residents were forced to move and sell their belongings, at which point the site became an area of antique trading. 

After the end of the Korean War, the area became a center of South Korea's artistic life and cafe culture. It was a popular destination among foreign visitors to South Korea during the 1960s, who called the area "Mary's Alley". It gained in popularity among international tourists during the 1988 Seoul Olympics. In 2000 the area was renovated, and, after protest, the rapid modernization of the area was halted for two years beginning that year. In recent years the backstreets of Insadong have continued to be gentrified with cafes, garden restaurants, and traditional pension-style accommodations.

Sights
Insadong-gil is "well known as a traditional street to both locals and foreigners" and represents the "culture of the past and the present". It contains a mixture of historical and modern atmosphere and is a "unique area of Seoul that truly represents the cultural history of the nation." The majority of the traditional buildings originally belonged to merchants and bureaucrats. Some larger residences, built for retired government officials during the Joseon period, can also be seen. Most of these older buildings are now used as restaurants or shops. Among the historically significant buildings located in the area are Unhyeongung mansion, Jogyesa, one of the most significant Korean Buddhist temples, and Seungdong Presbyterian Church, one of Korea's oldest Presbyterian churches. The central temple of Cheondoism can also be found in the vicinity, which was completed in 1921.

The area is well known for sightseeing, with approximately 100,000 visitors on Sundays reported in 2000. Insadong is also a visiting spot for foreign dignitaries such as Queen Elizabeth II and the princess of Spain and the Netherlands. It contains 40 percent of the nation's antique shops and art galleries as well as 90 percent of the traditional stationery shops. Particularly noteworthy is Tongmungwan, the oldest bookstore in Seoul, and Kyung-in Art Gallery, the oldest tea house. There are daily calligraphy demonstrations and pansori performances.

Ssamziegil, a shopping mall that concentrates on specialty stores of handcrafts, is also a prominent destination in Insadong. It opened in 2004.

Other attractions
Unhyeon Palace, Bosingak bell pavilion, and Jongno Tower can be found in this area.
Samcheongdong is also a nearby dong with an art scene. There is also an express bus to the resort island of Namiseom where the popular Korean drama Winter Sonata was filmed.

The area is on the Seoul list of Asia's 10 greatest street food cities for the gimbap, odeng, and bungeoppang.

Information Centers
At Insadong, there are three information centers that offer information or information materials about Insadong and Seoul. They are the Insadong P.R. Center, North Information Center (N-info center), and South Information Center (S-info center). N-info Center and S-info Center are located at the north and south entrances of Insadong's main street. Insa P.R. Center is located on the opposite side of Ssamziegil, a well-known shopping center in Insadong.
At the Insa P.R. Center, visitors can have a hanbok (Korean traditional dress) experience.

Transport
 Jonggak Station (Station #131 on Line 1)
 Jongno 3-ga Station (Station #130 on Line 1, Station #329 on Line 3, Station #534 on Line 5)
 Anguk Station (Station #328 on Seoul Metro  Line 3, TEL 02-6110-3281 ) ☆Way out #6

In January 2013, the Seoul Metropolitan Rapid Transit Corporation published free guidebooks in three languages: English, Japanese, and Chinese (simplified and traditional), which feature eight tours as well as recommendations for accommodations, restaurants, and shopping centers. These were distributed from information centers in 44 subway stations, namely Itaewon Station on Line 6 and Gwanghwamun Station on Line 5. 

The tours are designed with different themes, e.g. Korean traditional culture, which goes from Jongno 3-ga Station to Anguk Station and Gyeongbokgung Station on Line 3 that showcases antique shops and art galleries of this area.

See also
 Daehangno
 Bukchon Hanok Village
 Jogyesa
 Jongno-gu

References

Notes

Bibliography

Further reading
 
 Insa-dong Poets (인사동시인들, 2008). Seoul: Chopan.
 Kim, I-gyeong. (2005). Insa-dong kaneun kil (인사동가는길). Seoul: Paran Chajeongeo.
 Pak, Chung-sik. (2003). Insadong-e osin putta t'ingnattan (인사동에오신붓다틱낫한). Seoul: Myeongsang.
 Pak, In-sik. (2005). Insadong Blues. (인사동블루스 : 박인식실명소설) Seoul: Paum.
 Insadong kago sipeun nal (인사동가고싶은날, 2002). Seoul: Design House.
 Yi, Saeng-jin. (2006). Insa-dong : Yi Saeng-jin sijip (인사동 : 이생진시집). Seoul: Uri Keul.

External links 

 Insadong, the Largest Traditional Art Market :Visitseoul
 Insadong shopping area
 Official Korea Tourism Organization- Insadong 

Neighbourhoods of Jongno-gu
Culture of Seoul
Tourist attractions in Seoul
Shopping districts and streets in South Korea